This is a list of Algerian Cup winning football managers.

Winning managers

By individual

By nationality

References

Managers
Algerian Cup